Faye Smythe (born 25 November 1985) is a New Zealand television actor, best known for her role in Shortland Street as Nurse Tania Jeffries.

Early life
Smythe, is of mixed race ancestry and was born in Cape Town. She emigrated to New Zealand with her family at the age of eleven. Smythe finished high school and started work on a communications degree, but left college to train as a fitness instructor. She was still pursuing acting, but after auditioning unsuccessfully for a number of parts, including Shortland Street character Tania Jeffries, Smythe decided to put her acting ambitions on hold for a year and re-enrolled for university. When she got a callback for Tania, she wasn't sure she even wanted the part - but she did the audition, and was asked to join the Shortland Street cast. Smythe also was on Legend of the Seeker as Sister Merissa.

Shortland Street
Smythe first auditioned for Shortland Street for the part of Tama Hudson's sister, Mihi. She did not get the part, but made an impact on the producers. She was asked to audition for Shannon, before being offered her the six-week role of Tama's cat-burgling friend Kat.

Filmography

References

External links

Living people
Cape Coloureds
New Zealand television actresses
New Zealand soap opera actresses
1985 births
South African emigrants to New Zealand
21st-century New Zealand actresses